The Oil Tanker Moratorium Act, introduced and commonly referred to as Bill C-48, is an act of the Parliament of Canada and was passed by the 42nd Canadian Parliament in 2019. The Act was introduced as Bill C-48 with the long title An Act respecting the regulation of vessels that transport crude oil or persistent oil to or from ports or marine installations located along British Columbia’s north coast.

Notes

References

 
Canadian federal legislation
2019 in Canadian law